The Defoid languages are a proposed branch of the Benue–Congo language family. The name of the group derives from the fact that nearly all of the ethnic groups who speak member languages refer to the city of Ilé Ifè as their place of origin: "Defoid" comes from èdè ('language') + ifè (Ife) + oid. It was first proposed by Capo (1989), but evidence for it is still regarded as insufficient by Güldemann (2018).

The Defoid language group consists of three branches, Yoruboid, Akoko and  Ayere-Ahan.

References

External links
 Niger–Congo languages spoken in Nigeria

Volta–Niger languages